Deri Rugby Football Club is a Welsh rugby union team based in Deri, Caerphilly in Wales. The club is a member of the Welsh Rugby Union and is a feeder club for the Newport Gwent Dragons. Deri RFC is currently the only rugby club in Wales that has a women's XV but no men's team.

References

Welsh rugby union teams